Sidewalk Scientist is a Hong Kong TV programme broadcast by TVB and presented by Kaki Leung, Ali Lee, Jacqueline Wong, Mayanne Mak, Sammi Cheung, Roxanne Tong, Crystal Fung, Bowie Cheung, Tiffany Lau, Judy Kwong, Regina Ho, Honey Ho, Eunice Chan and Joey Thye.  This programme explores the scientific knowledge in daily life through different experiments. Despite its English title, there are also segments to correct common misuse of English or Chinese, to clarify of legal misconceptions and to introduce local history. Sammy Leung was invited as guest host of the special episode of season 1 and has since become a returning guest host in following seasons. In season 2, a male guest host will join in as 'Captain'. In season 3, all of the episodes revolved around sports.

The show was nominated at the 2013, 2015 and 2016 TVB Anniversary Awards for the Best Informative Programme, and won the award in 2016.

Topics
A very wide range of topics have been covered by the show, such as:

 Are there more bacteria in your mouth than on a toilet seat?
 Will dry ice explode?
 Are there any alternative uses of salt?
 Can a human walk on eggs?

Awards and nominations

References

External links
Sidewalk Scientist Season 1
Sidewalk Scientist Season 2
Sidewalk Scientist Season 3
Sidewalk Scientist Season 4

TVB original programming
Educational television series
2013 Hong Kong television series debuts